Abdul Kalim (11 September 1969 – 25 July 2021) was a Fijian international lawn bowler.

Bowls career
Kalim won the bronze medal in the pairs with Ratish Lal at the 2011 Asia Pacific Bowls Championships in Adelaide.

He was selected to represent Fiji at the 2014 Commonwealth Games, where he competed in the triples and fours events.

In 2019, he won a gold medal at the Pacific Games in the triples event.

References

1969 births
2021 deaths
Fijian male bowls players
Fijian Muslims
Bowls players at the 2014 Commonwealth Games
Commonwealth Games competitors for Fiji